Live at the Stephen Talkhouse is a live album by the American singer/songwriter Suzanne Vega. This concert was recorded at The Stephen Talkhouse in Amagansett, New York on 29 August 2003 and released on 25 October 2005.

Track listing 
All tracks composed by Suzanne Vega; except where indicated
 "Tired of Sleeping" 	4:00
 "Widow's Walk" 	4:08
 "Caramel" 	3:14
 "Marlene On The Wall" 	4:44
 "(I'll Never Be) Your Maggie May" 	3:59
 "Penitent" 	4:26
 "Gypsy" 	4:17
 "Left of Center" (music: Vega, Steve Addabbo)	2:53
 "Harbor Song" 	4:48
 "The Queen and the Soldier" 	5:12
 "Blood Makes Noise" 	3:23
 "Luka" 	5:07
 "Tom's Diner" 	3:23
 "Rosemary" 	3:40

Personnel
Suzanne Vega - guitar, vocals
Billy Masters - guitar
Mike Visceglia - bass
Doug Yowell - drums

References 

2005 live albums
Suzanne Vega albums